The Getaway may refer to:

Books 
 The Getaway (novel), a 1958 novel by Jim Thompson
 Diary of a Wimpy Kid: The Getaway, the twelfth book in the Diary of a Wimpy Kid series

Film 
 The Get-Away (1941 film), a 1941 remake of the 1935 crime film Public Hero No. 1
 The Getaway (1972 film), a 1972 film adaptation of the 1958 novel, starring Steve McQueen and Ali MacGraw
 The Getaway (1994 film), a 1994 film adaptation of the 1958 novel, starring Alec Baldwin and Kim Basinger

Television 
 "The Getaway" (Alias), a second season episode of Alias
 "The Getaway" (Dexter), a 2009 episode of the American drama television series Dexter
 "The Getaway" (Tru Calling), a first season episode of Tru Calling
 "The Getaway" (Everybody Loves Raymond), a third season episode of Everybody Loves Raymond
 "The Getaway" (Legends of Tomorrow), a fourth season episode of Legends of Tomorrow
 The Getaway (TV series), a TV series on the Esquire Network
 "The Getaway" (SpongeBob SquarePants), an episode of SpongeBob SquarePants

Music 
 The Getaway (Chris de Burgh album), 1982
 The Getaway (Red Hot Chili Peppers album), 2016
 The Getaway World Tour, 2016–17 concert tour by Red Hot Chili Peppers
 The Getaway EP, a song by English indie rock band Athlete
 "The Getaway", a song by Hilary Duff
 "The Getaway", a song by American punk band Ten Foot Pole

Video games 
 The Getaway (pinball machine), a 1992 pinball machine made by Williams
 The Getaway (video game), the first game in the video game series The Getaway
 The Getaway: Black Monday, the second game in the video game series The Getaway
 The Getaway 3, a cancelled third game in the video game series The Getaway

See also 
 
 
 Getaway (disambiguation)